Afghan cuisine is influenced to a certain extent by Persian, Central Asian and Indian cuisines due to Afghanistan's close proximity and cultural ties. The cuisine is halal and mainly based on mutton, beef, poultry and fish with rice and Afghan bread. Accompanying these are common vegetables and dairy products, such as milk, yogurt, whey, etc., and fresh and dried fruits such as apples, apricots, grapes, bananas, oranges, plums, pomegranates, sweet melons, raisin, etc. The diet of most Afghans revolve around rice-based dishes, while various forms of naan is consumed with most meals. Tea is generally consumed daily in large quantities, and is a major part of hospitality. The culinary specialties reflect the nation's ethnic and geographic diversity. The national dish of Afghanistan is Kabuli palaw, a rice dish cooked with raisins, carrots, nuts and lamb or beef.

Background

The cuisine of Afghanistan is halal and has elements from various places, for example garam masala from India, coriander and mint from Iran, dumplings and noodles from Uzbekistan and Xinjiang in China, and Baklava from Turkey.  The similarities can be seen in the use of spices like cumin and cinnamon (as in Indian cuisine), green cardamom flavors (as in Chinese tea), and kebabs and yoghurts (as in Turkish and Arabic cuisines).

Staple foods

Rice

Rice is a core staple food in Afghan cuisine and the most important part of any meal. Biryani is one of the lesser popular rice dishes in Afghanistan. It is consumed mostly in cities closer to neighboring Pakistan, such as Kandahar, Jalalabad and Khost. Palaw is cooked similarly to challow, but a combination of meat, stock, and herbs are also mixed in before baking, resulting in the elaborate colors, flavors, and aromas from which the rice got its name. Sometimes caramelized sugar is used to give the rice a rich brown color. Examples of palaw include:
 Kabuli palaw (the national dish) – meat and stock are added, plus a topping of fried raisins, slivered carrots, and pistachios
 Yakhni palaw – meat and stock are added to give the rice a brown color
 Zamarod palaw – spinach  is mixed in before the baking process, hence zamarod, meaning "emerald"
 Bore palaw – lawand is added giving the rice a yellow color
 Landi palaw – a traditional meal of rice (with stock made from chicken or mutton that has been salted and dried in the sun)
 Bonjan-e-roomi palaw – bonjan-e-roomi (tomato ) is added during baking giving the rice a red color
 Shibet palaw – fresh dill and raisins are added during baking
 Narenj palaw – a sweet elaborate rice dish made with saffron, orange peel, pistachios, almonds, and chicken
 Maash palaw – a strictly vegetarian sweet-and-sour pilaf baked with mung beans, apricots, and bulgur wheat
 Alou balou palaw – a sweet rice dish with plums and chicken

Afghan bread

Afghan bread is flat and cooked in a tanoor or tandoor (a vertical ground clay oven). The bread is slapped onto a stone wall to cook. Tabakhai is a flatbread cooked on a flat upside down pan.

Major dishes

Steamed dumplings

There is a wide variety of dumplings. Known under the name khameerbob and often eaten as dumplings, these native dishes are popular. Due to the long time required to make the dough for the dumplings, they are rarely served at large gatherings, such as weddings. They are instead served on special occasions at home. 
 Aushak – dumplings filled with a mixture consisting mainly of leeks, topped with either garlic-mint  or a garlic yogurt sauce, sautéed tomatoes, red kidney beans, and a well-seasoned ground-meat mixture (It is a dish associated with Kabul, the capital of Afghanistan.)
 Mantu – steamed dumplings filled with onion and ground beef or lamb, usually topped with a tomato- and yogurt- or -based sauce and then garnished with dried mint and coriander (The yogurt-based topping is usually a mixture of yogurt, garlic, and split chickpeas.

Qormah

Qormah (also spelled "korma" or "qorma") is an onion- and tomato-based stew or casserole usually served with challow rice. First, onion is caramelized, for a richly colored stew. Then tomato is added, along with a variety of fruits, spices, and vegetables, depending on the recipe. The main ingredient, which can be meat or other vegetables, is added last. There are hundreds of different types of  including:
 Qormah e gosht (meat ) – usually the main  served with palaw at gatherings
 Qormah e alou-bokhara wa dalnakhod – onion-based using veal or chicken, sour plums, lentils, and cardamom
 Qormah e nadroo – onion-based, using lamb meat or veal, yogurt, lotus roots, cilantro, and coriander
 Qormah e lawand – onion-based, using chicken, lamb, or beef, plus yogurt, turmeric, and cilantro
 Qormah e sabzi – lamb, sautéed spinach, and other greens
 Qormah e shalgham – onion-based using lamb, turnips, and sugar (sweet and sour taste)

Kabob

Afghan kabob is most often found in restaurants and at outdoor street vendor stalls. Most of the time, it contains lamb meat. Kabob is made with naan instead of rice. Customers have the option to sprinkle sumac or ghora (dried ground sour grapes) on their kabob. Pieces of fat from the sheep's tail are usually added to the skewers to add extra flavor.

Other popular kabobs include the lamb chop, ribs, kofta (ground beef), and chicken.

Chapli kebab, a specialty of eastern Afghanistan, is a patty of minced beef. It is a popular barbecue meal in both Pakistan and Afghanistan. It is prepared flat and round and served with naan. The original recipe of chapli kabob dictates a half meat, half flour mixture which renders it lighter in taste and less expensive.

Chicken
Afghan chicken or murgh-e Afghan is a classic example of one of the most famous dishes of Afghanistan. Chicken dishes are usually found in restaurants and at outdoor street vendor stalls. Unlike in the Indian cooking style, chicken in Afghan cuisine is often used with the intention that it be halal. Cream, butter, and curd are customary ingredients in all chicken recipes, whether served as an appetizer or a main course.

Quroot
Quroot (or qoroot) is a reconstituted dairy product, traditionally a by-product of butter made from sheep's or goat's milk. The residual buttermilk remaining after churning butter is soured further (by keeping it at room temperature for a few days), treated with salt, and then eventually boiled. The precipitated casein is filtered through cheesecloth, pressed in order to remove liquid, and then shaped into balls; the product is thus a hard and very sour cottage cheese. Though it can be eaten raw as a savory snack, it is typically served with cooked Afghan dishes such as aushak, mantu, and kichri qoroot.

Miscellaneous

 Afghan burger
 Afghan Chatni made with fresh coriander leaves 
 Afghan Kofta (meatballs)
 Afghan salad
 Aush (hand-made noodles)
 Baamiyah or Bhindi (cooked okra)
 Badenjan (cooked eggplant with potatoes and tomatoes)
 Badenjan-Burani (fried slices of eggplant, topped with a garlic sour cream sauce and sprinkled with dried mint)
 Badenjan Salad (eggplant salad with garlic)
 Bichak (small turnovers with various fillings, including potato and herbs, or ground meat)
 Bolani also called “Buregian” in southern Afghanistan (somewhat similar to a Quesadilla)
 Chakida or chakka (type of sour cream)
 Chopan (Pashto/Persian: چوپان, meaning "shepherd") kabob (Pashto/Persian: کباب) (lamb chops skewered and grilled on charcoal)
 Dampukht (steamed rice)
 Delda or Oagra (mainly a Southern dish, whose main ingredient is a mixture of split wheat and a variety of beans)
 Dolma (stuffed grape leaves)
 Gosh e feel (thin, fried pastries covered in powdered sugar and ground pistachios)
 Halwaua-e-Aurd-e-Sujee
 Kaddo Borwani (sweet pumpkins)
 Kalah Chuquki or Kalah Gunjeshk (battered deep-fried bird heads)
 Kalah Pacha (lamb or beef head/feet cooked in a broth, served in bowls as a soup dish or in a stew or curry)
 Kebab (similar to Middle Eastern and Central Asian style)
 Khoujoor (Afghan pastry, deep-fried, oval-shaped, similar to doughnuts in taste)
 Kichri (sticky medium-grain rice cooked with mung beans and onions)
 Londi, or gusht-e-qaaq (spiced jerky)
 Maast or labanyat (type of plain yogurt)
 Maushawa (mixed beans and tiny meatballs, served in a bowl)
 Moraba (fruit preserves, sugar syrup and fruits, apple, sour cherry, or various berries, or made with dried fruits. "Afghan favorite is the Alu-Bakhara".)
 Nargis kabob (egg-based angel hair pasta soaked in sugar syrup, wrapped around a piece of meat)
 Narenge Palau (dried sweet orange peel and green raisins with a variety of nuts, mixed with yellow rice glazed with light sugar syrup)
 Osh Pyozee (stuffed onion)
 Owmach (made from flour; a soup-like dish, very thick and pasty)
 Salata (tomato and onion-based salad, often incorporating cucumber)
 Rosh (cooked lamb and mutton with no spices)
 Shami kabob (cooked beef blended with spices, flour, and eggs, and rolled into hot dog shapes or flat round shapes and fried)
 Shola Ghorbandi
 Shor-Nakhood (chickpeas with special toppings)
 Torshi (eggplant and carrot mixed with other herbs and spices, pickled in vinegar and aged)

Desserts and snacks

As a desert after a meal, most Afghans generally eat fresh fruits such as apples, apricots, bananas, grapes, mangoes, melons, oranges, pears, pomegranates, etc. For snacks, they drink tea with something sweet like cakes, cookies or pastries. On some occasions they also eat dried fruits which are always widely available in every Afghan market. Others may eat any of the following: 
 Afghan Cake (similar to pound cake, sometimes with real fruit or jelly inside)
 Afghan Ice Cream
 Baklava (pastry)
 Cream roll (pastry)
 Falooda or Faloodeh
 Firini
 Fernea, sometimes spelled , (milk and cornstarch help make this very sweet, similar to rice pudding without the rice)
 Kolcha (variety of cookies, baked in clay ovens with charcoal)
 Sheer Yakh, a traditional wet ice cream 
 Sheer khurma, a traditional dessert
 Sheer Berinj (rice pudding)

Soups

 Shorba (Afghan soup similar to borscht)
 Shorwa-E-Tarkari (meat and vegetable soup)
 Peyawa or Eshkana (a soup based on flour, very similar to a gravy, but mixed with chopped onion, potatoes, and eggs)
 Aushe Sarka (vinegar-based flat noodle soup, tastes very similar to Chinese hot and sour soup)

Drinks

Chai

Chai is tea in Afghanistan, which can either be green or black. It is consumed at all times, especially a short time after finishing a meal or with guests during any social gathering. Most people drink green tea with no sugar. Some add cardamom, saffron, or sugar.

Sheer chai (which translates from "milk tea") is also consumed but mostly in the morning and on special occasions. It is a type of Kashmiri chai. Many people of Afghanistan also drink masala chai, particularly in cities such as Asadabad, Jalalabad, Khost and Kandahar.

Doogh
Doogh (also known by some Afghans as shomleh or shlombeh) is a cold drink made by mixing water with yogurt and then adding fresh or dried mint. Some variations of doogh include the addition of crushed or diced cucumber chunks. It is the second most widely consumed drink in Afghanistan (the first being tea), especially during lunchtime in summer. Doogh can be found at almost every Afghan grocery store and is served in restaurants.

Eating habits

Sub-cuisines
While Afghans have a common cuisine, certain ethnicities form sub-variations of it.

Pashtun cuisine

Pashtuns are the largest ethnic group of Afghanistan, constituting about 42% of the country's total population. A major dish in Pashtun culture are Rosh (cooked lamb and mutton with no spices) and Sohbat, found at traditional gatherings and events. Other major Pashtun dishes include lamb-skewered sajji and chapli kebab. The name dampukht stands for steamed meat, and Khaddi kebab is the Afghan shashlik, which is grilled on an open fire, on a spit.

Although it differs from region to region, Pashtun cuisine is meat-heavy and often includes caramelized rice. For example, the dish known as bolani in the north and east is often called borogyen in the south and west of Afghanistan.

Common summer beverages include shlombeh, also known in Persian as doogh, a drink consisting of liquid yogurt, mint, and bedreng (Afghan cucumber). Sherbet is an ice-sugared cold drink. Sheer yakh is a sweet ice-like product, literally translating to "cold milk".

Hazara cuisine

The Hazara people in central Afghanistan (in the region of Hazarajat) and western Pakistan (Balochistan province) have their own fare. The Hazaragi cuisine shares some similarities with neighboring regional cuisines, so it is mainly influenced by Central Asian, Persian, and South Asian cooking. However, cooking methods vary in some of the dishes of these neighboring cuisines.

Dining etiquette
Traditionally, dinners are held on a tablecloth on the floor, which is called the dastarkhan. Meals are normally eaten with the right hand. After a meal, tea with dessert is served.

Special occasions 
Serving tea and white sugared almonds (called nuql) is customary during Afghan festivals.

See also

 Culture of Afghanistan
 Economy of Afghanistan

References

Further reading
 

 
South Asian cuisine
Pashtun cuisine
Uzbekistani cuisine
Tajik cuisine